The Township of Elkins is one of thirty-seven townships in Washington County, Arkansas, USA. As of the 2000 census, its total population was 1,251.

Geography

Cities, towns, villages
Elkins
Harris

Cemeteries
The township contains Stokenbury Cemetery.

Major routes
 Arkansas Highway 16
 Arkansas Highway 74

References

 United States Census Bureau 2008 TIGER/Line Shapefiles
 United States National Atlas

External links
 US-Counties.com
 City-Data.com

Townships in Washington County, Arkansas
Townships in Arkansas